Strauch, a German word meaning bush or shrub, is a surname.  Notable people with it include:

 Adolfo Strauch, (b. 1948), survivor of the Uruguayan Air Force Flight 571 crash
 Adolph Strauch (1822–1883), landscape architect
 Aegidius Strauch II (1632–1682), German mathematician and theologian
 Alexander Strauch, Russian naturalist
 Eduard Strauch (1906–1955), German Nazi SS-Obersturmbannführer and Holocaust perpetrator
 Eduardo Strauch,(b. 1947), survivor of the Uruguayan Air Force Flight 571 crash
James Strauch (1921–1998), American Olympic fencer
 Marten Strauch (born 1986), German international rugby union player
 Philipp Strauch (1862–1924), Russian sailor of German origin, who competed in the 1912 Summer Olympics
 Pierre Strauch (born 1958), French cellist, composer and conductor

See also 
 Strauch Field, a private Airport located 2 miles south of Junction City in Lane County, Oregon, USA
 Strauch's pitviper (Gloydius strauchi), a venomous pitviper species found in western China
 Strauch's spotted newt (Neurergus strauchii), a salamander species found only in Turkey

German-language surnames
Jewish surnames